is a passenger railway station located in the city of Himeji, Hyōgo Prefecture, Japan, operated by the private Sanyo Electric Railway.

Lines

Station layout
The station consists of two unnumbered ground-level side platforms connected by a level crossing. The station building and sole entrance is located at the north west end of the Shikama bound platform. The station is unattended.

Platforms

Adjacent stations

|-
!colspan=5|Sanyo Electric Railway

History
Sanyo-Temma Station opened on April 27, 1941.

Passenger statistics
In fiscal 2018, the station was used by an average of 1190 passengers daily (boarding passengers only).

Surrounding area
Shioiri River,
Japan National Route 250

See also
List of railway stations in Japan

References

External links

  Official website (Sanyo Electric Railway) 

Railway stations in Japan opened in 1941
Railway stations in Himeji